Asko Päiviö Ivalo (24 June 1901, in Helsinki – 2 November 1968) was a Finnish diplomat who served over 40 years as Ambassador and as Head of the Political Department of the Foreign Ministry.

Asko Ivalo's parents were writer Santeri Ivalo (formerly Ingman) and Ellinor Ivalo. He was married to sculptor Emil Wikström's daughter Mielikki Wikström.They had three children.

Ivalo has been employed by the Ministry for Foreign Affairs since 1926 and served as a diplomat in Tallinn, Stockholm, Moscow, Bulgaria, Yugoslavia, Paris

As Envoy in Ankara 1951–1954, the Hague 1947–1951, Pakistan 1951–1954, Teheran 1951–1954 and ambassador to Damascus 1958–1959, Bangkok 1964–1968, Rome 1954–1961, New Delhi 1964–1968 and Jakarta 1964–1968.

Sources 
 Juhani Kerkkosen Genealogy-sivusto: Ivalo Asko & Wikström Mielikki

1901 births
1968 deaths
Ambassadors of Finland to Syria
Ambassadors of Finland to Thailand
Ambassadors of Finland to Italy
Ambassadors of Finland to India
Ambassadors of Finland to Indonesia
Diplomats from Helsinki